Elin Pelin (8 July 1877 – 3 December 1949), born Dimitar Ivanov Stoyanov is  considered Bulgaria’s best narrator of the Bulgarian (Balkan) countryside and village.

Biography
Born into a large family in the village of Bailovo near Sofia, he loved writing and reading from an early age.  Studying to become a teacher, he taught for a year in 1895 in his native village. He was first published in 1901, and the respect it earned him in literary circles encouraged him to go to Sofia in 1903, where he worked as a librarian at the university library. It was during this period he took his now-famous pseudonym from the word pelin, a type of Bulgarian country wine. He spent 1906–07 in France, perfecting his skills in the language. By this time, he was already a popular writer.

Between 1910 and 1916, he was the director of special collections at the National Library and also served as editor of numerous magazines, including the children's publication Veselushka. Additionally, he served as a war correspondent during World War I.

In 1911, one of his most famous Bulgarian literary works appeared, The Gerak Family (Bulgarian: Geratsite). It is one of the best-known pieces of Bulgarian literature and critically deals with the Bulgarian traditional village family experiencing the transition from the simplicity of rurality to the modernization of Bulgarian society, a social world in which old country traditional practices founded on family love and dedication to the country land start to disappear. His second great work in the Bulgarian literary canon, Earth (Bulgarian: Zemya), was published in 1922. In this book, Pelin created a memorable gallery of characters which maybe identified with the Bulgarian national character and Balkan consciousness.

Pelin's literary works—poems, short stories and novels—recreated the peasantry and countryside atmosphere of the post-liberation Bulgaria. His predilection for short stories led him to write many, of which the humorous Pizho and Penda is perhaps the best known. A genuine country realism, with descriptions full of light and color, classify his works. Considered one of the masters of Bulgarian prose, he was also one of the initiators of Bulgarian children's literature. His tales of Yan Bibiyan and his voyages to the moon still delight today.

From 1924 until 1944, Pelin served as conservator at the Ivan Vazov Museum, all the while continuing to write, mostly for children, and be published.  In 1940, he was named president of the Union of Bulgarian Writers.

After the War, he managed to escape being blacklisted as a forbidden author by the Communist government of the People's Republic of Bulgaria. The regime chose to consider his works as those of a realistic, critical author, а precursor of Socialist Realism who, although not having correctly seized the true nature of the Bourgeois state, knew how to tell about the life of the working class and individual revolt of exploited peasants.

Earth and The Gerak Family, amongst other works, have been filmed several times (1930 and 1957, and 1958, respectively).

The Bulgarian town of Elin Pelin was named after him, as is Elin Pelin Point on Smith Island, South Shetland Islands.

References

External links
 Virtual Library of Bulgarian Literature Slovoto - library of online Bulgarian literature in Bulgarian and a number of other languages.
 

1877 births
1949 deaths
Bulgarian writers
Bulgarian children's writers
People from Sofia Province
Burials at Central Sofia Cemetery
Bulgarian male short story writers
Bulgarian speculative fiction writers
Bulgarian male writers
Bulgarian librarians
20th-century Bulgarian short story writers
20th-century Bulgarian writers